Vyacheslav Poyto (born 11 November 1982) is a Belarusian equestrian. He competed in the individual eventing at the 2008 Summer Olympics.

References

1982 births
Living people
Belarusian male equestrians
Olympic equestrians of Belarus
Equestrians at the 2008 Summer Olympics
Sportspeople from Minsk